Ricardo Carvalho (born 1978) is a Portuguese former footballer.

Ricardo Carvalho may also refer to:
Ricardo Carvalho (writer) (1910–1990), Spanish writer
Ricardo de Carvalho (born 1967), Brazilian rower
Ricardo Carvalho (footballer, born 1996), Portuguese footballer who plays as a defender